Gregory Davis, Jr. (born September 25, 1993), better known as Greg Tarzan Davis is an American actor. Born in New Orleans he began in theater, moved to Los Angeles, and starting his acting career. In 2022, he played the role of Javy "Coyote" Machado in the highly anticipated  Top Gun: Maverick film. In 2021, he received a recurring role on ABC's series Grey’s Anatomy. He also had a supporting role in the horror film Tales from the Hood 2 (2018).

Early life and education 
Gregory Davis Jr. was born on September 25, 1993, in New Orleans. He was born to Gregory Davis, Sr. and Colette Butler. His father was a boxer, while his mother worked in telecommunications. He has a large family. He graduated from Edna Karr High School in 2011 and he was a running back on the football team. Davis attended Louisiana State University in Baton Rouge, where he majored in elementary education and teaching. He was first enrolled in dental college at LSU but after his freshman year, he decided to switch majors. Davis graduated in 2015.

Career
While attending LSU, Davis began his career on social media posting comic videos on the Instagram and Vine platforms doing comedy skits and videos. He posted under the pseudonym "TheRealTarzan", thus becoming recognizable as "Tarzan". This self-given nickname was from his recognizable physique and loc hairstyle being similar to the character Tarzan. Davis's friend, NickNack PattiWhack, who is known for the "Oh No Baby, What Is You Doing?” meme and their viral song "Where Is Da Milk" also amassed a large following on Vine and YouTube. Davis can be seen in the music video for "Where Is Da Milk". Davis and a group of friends all gained celebrity upon social media success. His brother, Mcashole, and friends NickNack PattiWhack, Dan Rue, 2realmacdatfee, and Tokyo Vanity eventually gained local celebrity status in the New Orleans area.

Davis created a weekly soap opera on Instagram titled Living with Jane and followed it with a sequel, Living with Jane 2. Davis wrote, produced, recorded, and acted as every character in the weekly soap opera.

In his last semester in college, Davis took up acting and starred in an LSU theater production of By the Way, Meet Vera Stark playing the character of Leroy Barksdale. After graduating in 2015, Davis started as an Elementary School Teacher for the Louisiana State University Laboratory School teaching 1st-3rd graders. Davis decided to pursue acting after "I realized it was time to change careers after preaching to my students that they should follow their dreams no matter what." After almost two years of teaching, Davis switched his focus to acting. Davis has done modeling with companies such as Nike and Coca-Cola.

He began performing in various stage plays and films throughout the New Orleans area. He landed a guest role as Reece on the hit TV series Chicago P.D. in 2017.

Acting 
In 2018, Davis moved to Los Angeles to focus on his acting career. He played Kahad in the horror-comedy direct-to-video anthology film Tales from the Hood 2. Davis recently recurred on Freeform’s Good Trouble and had a guest-starring role in CBS's All Rise.

In May 2021, Davis signed with ICM Partners.

In November 2021, it was announced that Davis has joined the cast of ABC's medical drama series Grey's Anatomy. It was his first major role; he portrays Dr. Jordan Wright, who is from Minnesota, the favorite of Dr. Nick Marsh (Scott Speedman), and crosses paths with main character Meredith Grey (Ellen Pompeo).

He is in Top Gun: Maverick. Davis will also work with Tom Cruise, a friend of his, in the upcoming Mission: Impossible – Dead Reckoning Part One.

Personal life
Davis has an intricate workout plan and enjoys baking and cooking.

Filmography

Films

Television series

References

External links
 
 Tarzan Davis on Instagram

1993 births
Living people
American male film actors
American male television actors
African-American male actors
21st-century American male actors
Louisiana State University alumni
21st-century African-American people
20th-century African-American people
Male actors from New Orleans
People from New Orleans
Vine (service) celebrities